AP-3 complex subunit beta-2 is a protein that in humans is encoded by the AP3B2 gene.

References

External links

Further reading